Centro Deportivo Español was a former Mexican football team that played in the Primera Fuerza prior to the professionalization and development of the Mexican first division. The club was established in 1914.

History
Deportivo Español was founded in 1914 by the Spanish migrates that lived in Mexico City. Spanish during this time period began forming many clubs in Mexico City. Among Deportivo Español there were, Club España in 1912, Club Cataluña in 1917, Asturias in 1918, and Aurrerá in 1919 . The club began to participate in the league from the 1914–15 to 1919–20. During this period of time, people that had arrived to Mexico from Europe began forming clubs.

Primera Fuerza
During the time Deportivo Español spent in the league it did not fare well in the standings. The team usually ended in the lower half of the standings until it dissolved after the 1919–20 season. During the 1917–18 season Deportivo Español did not participate in the Primera Fuerza.

1914–15

1915–16

1916–17

1918–19

1919–20

See also
Football in Mexico

References

Defunct football clubs in Mexico City
Association football clubs established in 1911
Spanish-Mexican culture
Diaspora sports clubs
Primera Fuerza teams